Megasternum posticatum is a species of water scavenger beetle in the family Hydrophilidae. It is found in North America.

References

Further reading

 

Hydrophilidae
Articles created by Qbugbot
Beetles described in 1852